Squatting in Liberia is one of three ways to access land, the other being ownership by deed or customary ownership. West Point was founded in Monrovia in the 1950s and is estimated to house between 29,500 and 75,000 people. During the First Liberian Civil War 1989–1997 and the Second Liberian Civil War 1999–2003, many people in Liberia were displaced and some ended up squatting in Monrovia. The Ducor Hotel fell into disrepair and was squatted, before being evicted in 2007. Recently, over 9,000 Burkinabés were squatting on remote land and the Liberia Land Authority (LLA) has announced it will be titling all land in the country.

Overview 

Access to land in Liberia is achieved through squatting, ownership by deed or customary ownership (which does not use deeds). From the 1950s onwards there have been squatted informal settlements in the capital Monrovia. West Point was founded in the 1950s and is estimated to house between 29,500 and 75,000 people. Many squats are beside the sea and in 2013, 200 homes in New Kru Town were washed away by a high tide.

Civil wars 

During the First Liberian Civil War 1989–1997 and the Second Liberian Civil War 1999–2003, many people in Liberia were displaced and some ended up squatting in Monrovia. The government charged the squatters a US$20 annual fee to give squatters rights. This was allegedly based on the 1957 Zoning Code and although it gave no real legal right, it did give de facto tenure. The Grand Masonic Temple of the Masonic Order of Liberia was occupied by 8,000 squatters. The Ducor Hotel fell into disrepair and was squatted. The inhabitants were evicted in 2007. As of 2014, there were 27 squatted areas in Monrovia.

The ruined former palace of politician William Tubman in the town of Harper was also squatted. In the nation's second city Ganta, Gio and Mano ex-soldiers squatted following the end of conflict. They are Christian and supported Charles Taylor's faction, whereas the houses they squatted were owned by Mandinka people who are Muslim and who fought for the Liberians United for Reconciliation and Democracy (LURD), so this has created tensions over land ownership. From 2003 onwards, the local council has given squatters rights to people occupying privately owned land and the mayor herself was squatting. The mayor was forced to give up her squat in 2008 and cancel the squatters rights, yet this has not led to evictions. Around 2,000 former LURD soldiers occupied a plantation located between Monravia and the border with Sierra Leone. As of 2005, they were refusing to leave the site until the United Nations offered them retraining and they were supporting themselves by illegally tapping rubber.

2020 
In Grand Gedeh County, over 9,000 Burkinabés were squatting on remote land in 2020.
In January 2021, the Liberia Land Authority (LLA) announced it would be digitally titling all land in the country. The Minister of Finance Samuel D. Tweah said "We should stop calling people squatters; let those squatters confer titles on squatters and let’s move on. There are too many lands here in this country; government gets plenty land". In lower Margibi County, the residents of the 70 year old informal settlement Unification Town received title in 2020.

References

Further reading 
 

 
20th century in Liberia
Economy of Liberia
21st century in Liberia